The Chena Pump House, also known just as the Pump House Restaurant, is a restaurant at 796 Chena Pump Road in Fairbanks, Alaska.  The restaurant is located in the shell of a 1933 pumping station established by the Fairbanks Exploration Company,  Alaska's largest gold mining operator at the time.  The pump house was used to provide water to dredges operating on Cripple Creek in the Ester area.  The building was abandoned by the company in 1958, and was enlarged and converted into a restaurant in 1978.  It was listed on the National Register of Historic Places in 1982.

See also
National Register of Historic Places listings in Fairbanks North Star Borough, Alaska

References

External links
 The Pump House restaurant web site

Buildings and structures completed in 1933
Gold mining in Alaska
Industrial buildings and structures on the National Register of Historic Places in Alaska
Buildings and structures on the National Register of Historic Places in Fairbanks North Star Borough, Alaska
Restaurants in Alaska